Benjamin Pang Jeng Lo (Ben Lo) (April 1927 - October 12, 2018) was proponent of T’ai-chi ch’uan (Tàijíquán) in the United States.  Lo was a student of Cheng Man-ch'ing (Zheng Manqing), translated several influential Tàijíquán books into English, and was a teacher in his own right.

Biography
Benjamin Pang Jeng Lo was born in Jiangsu Province, China. In 1948, he and family moved to Taiwan. In 1949, when Lo was ill, his father sent him to see Cheng Man-ch'ing, a well-known artist and practitioner of traditional Chinese medicine.  Lo was not well enough to be treated with traditional herbs, so Cheng recommended he study T'ai Chi to build up his strength.  Lo began studying with him and continued to study and practice T’ai-chi for the rest of his life.

Lo graduated from National Taiwan University with a degree in Chinese literature. He then worked in the government, and later completed a master's in public administration at National Chengchi University.

In 1974, with Cheng's encouragement, Lo moved to San Francisco, where he began teaching Tàijíquán, establishing the Universal T'ai Chi Ch'uan studio. Along with teaching there, he traveled around the United States, Holland, Sweden and elsewhere in Europe, as well as Israel and Taiwan, holding workshops and camps for thousands of students.  Lo was a staunch defender of Cheng's teachings and reputation.  Lo often summarized his teaching into "Five basic principles for the development of good Tai Chi Ch'uan skills .... 1) Relaxation. 2) Separating Yin from Yang. 3) Turning the waist. 4) Keeping the body upright. And 5) Maintaining the hand like a beautiful lady's hand." Above all, he emphasized the need for practice.

Robert W. Smith, another martial artist and Tàijíquán proponent, wrote that Lo was "the best example of Zheng's (Cheng's) teaching in the U.S., and possibly the world."

Lo died in San Francisco on October 12, 2018.

Works

Translations
Lo was the lead translator for three books that were some of the earliest Tàijíquán books available in English.
 Reissued in 2008: , 

 Reissued in 2008: ,

Videos

References

External links

1927 births
2018 deaths
Chinese tai chi practitioners
American tai chi practitioners
American writers of Chinese descent
Taiwanese civil servants
National Chengchi University alumni
Taiwanese people from Jiangsu
20th-century Chinese translators
National Taiwan University alumni
Taiwanese translators
Chinese–English translators
Writers from Jiangsu
20th-century Taiwanese writers
20th-century Chinese male writers
Writers from San Francisco
Taiwanese emigrants to the United States
20th-century American male writers